Mezamir (560) was the chieftain of the Antes, an early Slavic tribal confederation in Eastern Europe, believed to have been active around the year 560, at which time the Avar expanded further into Europe. He was the son of Idariz, and had a brother, Kelagast.  Mezamir was recorded by Menander Protector (fl. 558–582). Mezamir was described as "powerful", and had most likely established a Slavic confederation sometime before the 560s, which initially thwarted the Avar khaganate.  At this time, the Antes were subject to the Byzantine Empire, ruled by Justinian I (r. 527–565), with the supreme chieftain holding the Byzantine title of archon. The Antes were given old Roman towns and stipends, in exchange for securing the Danube from the Huns, and other Barbarians. At this time, the Antes held an "extensive polity, capable of military mobilization against the Avars." The Avars were ruled by khagan Bayan I, and they used to pillage the Antes land, which at the time was neighbouring the Kutrigurs, who were Avar allies.  After the Avars had ravaged and plundered the Antes, Mezamir was sent as an envoy to the Avars, to negotiate the ransom of captured Antes tribesmen. At the talks, Mezamir appeared to be a "loudmouth braggart" who spoke arrogantly and rashly; upon feeling that Mezamir became more arrogant than suitable for an envoy, a Kutrigur Bulgar who was a "friend of the Avars" and "hostile to the Antes" (believed by some to be khagan Zabergan; fl. 558–562) persuaded the Khagan that:

The Avars disregarded the immunity of ambassadors (according to the jus gentium) and killed Mezamir. The Avars proceeded to conquer the Antes, and other Slavs. This took place in the time period of 560–62, according to some historians.

Annotations
Name: In historiography, he is mostly known as Mezamir, derived from Greek Mezamiros (Μεζαμηρος). Another spelling is Mezamer. The Bulgar variant is Bezmer. In Slavic, his name has been theorized to have been Mežamir (Межамир), Mužimir and Mezimir.

References

Sources
Primary

Secondary
 

6th-century rulers in Europe
6th-century Slavs
Murdered royalty
6th-century Byzantine people
Medieval diplomats
560s conflicts
East Slavic history
South Slavic history
Avar–Byzantine wars
Slavic warriors
6th-century diplomats